Christine "Tine" Wittler (born 2 April 1973 in Rahden) is a German writer, TV presenter and actress.

After studying in Lüneburg and Glamorgan (now the University of South Wales), Wittler worked as a freelance writer for NDR and presented the German television programme Bravo TV.

Since 1995, Wittler has been a resident of Hamburg-Ottensen, where she runs her own web store for plus-size clothing, prallewelt (since 2006). The fashion label was renamed to kingsizequeens in 2013 and has been passed to her co-owner.

Wittler presented the RTL show Einsatz in 4 Wänden from 2003 to 2013.

References

External links 
 

1973 births
Living people
People from Rahden
Alumni of the University of Glamorgan
German women writers
German television presenters
German television actresses
Businesspeople from North Rhine-Westphalia
20th-century German actresses
German women television presenters
RTL Group people